Allene Rosalind Jeanes (July 19, 1906 – December 11, 1995) was an American chemical researcher, whose  studies focused mainly on carbohydrates and the development of Dextran, a substance that replaced blood plasma in the Korean War. A member of the American Chemical Society, Jeanes published over 60 works, compiled 24 presentations, and received ten patents.

Early life and education 
Jeanes was born July 19, 1906, in Waco, Texas to Viola (Herring) and Largus Elonzo Jeanes, a switchman and later a yardmaster for the Cotton Belt Route of the St. Louis Southwestern Railway. In 1928, she received a bachelor's degree from Baylor University; in 1929, Jeanes obtained a master's degree from the University of California, Berkeley. She was Jewish.

From 1930 to 1935, Jeanes was employed as the head science teacher at Athens College in Athens, Alabama. From 1936 to 1937, she held a position as chemistry instructor at the University of Illinois. She received her PhD in organic chemistry from University of Illinois  in 1938, after working with Roger Adams.

Career 
From 1938 to 1940, Jeanes served as a corn industries research foundation fellow for the National Institutes of Health (NIH) with Claude Hudson and worked at the National Bureau of Standards with Horace S. Isbell. In 1941 she joined Roy L. Whistler at the U.S. Department of Agriculture’s Northern Regional Research Lab (NRRL) in Peoria, Illinois as a chemical researcher.  She  worked there  until 1976. Jeanes is credited with "a prominent role in making NRRL a world-class center for applied carbohydrate science".

Jeanes' area of research was natural polysaccharides, including starch (found in wheat, corn, rice, and potatoes), cellulose (found in cotton, wood, and paper), and dextran.  Jeanes was able to isolate dextran-producing bacteria from samples of bacteria-contaminated root beer supplied by a local Peoria company. This discovery was the basis for development of a mass production process for dextran, and its use in a dextran-based blood plasma extender. This plasma substitute was used by medical personal in the Korean and Vietnam wars. As a result of her work, Jeanes was the first woman to receive the Distinguished Service Award given by the Department of Agriculture, in 1953. She was also awarded the Garvan Medal  in 1956.

Jeanes was also part of the team that developed xanthan gum. Another polysaccharide, synthesized by the bacteria Xanthomonas campestris, xanthan gum acts as a thickener and keeps foods such as oil and vinegar salad dressings from separating.

She was a member of the American Chemical Society, Sigma Xi, and Iota Sigma Pi.

Later life 
Jeanes died on 11 December 1995 in Urbana, Illinois.

Awards 
 1953 – Distinguished Service Award from the USDA.
 1956 – Garvan Medal from the American Chemical Society.
 1962 – Federal Woman's Award from the U.S. Civil Service Commission.
 1968 – Superior Service Award to the Xanthan gum team, from the  United States Department of Agriculture
 1999 – posthumously inducted into the Agricultural Research Service Science Hall of Fame for her works in microbiological research that created life-saving polymers made from agricultural products.
2017 – posthumously inducted into the National Inventors Hall of Fame.

References

Further reading

20th-century American chemists
American women chemists
1906 births
1995 deaths
University of California, Berkeley alumni
Baylor University alumni
University of Illinois faculty
Recipients of the Garvan–Olin Medal
20th-century American women scientists
American women academics